Asher Dan Grunis (born January 17, 1945) was the President of the Supreme Court of Israel between 2012 and 2015. He was appointed to the position on February 28, 2012, after the retirement of Dorit Beinisch. He retired from the bench in January 2015 at the age of 70.

Biography
Asher Dan Grunis was born in Tel Aviv. He was named for his grandfather, the rabbi of Cardiff, Wales. Grunis served in the Israeli Army (1962–1965), earned an LL.B. degree (1968) from the Hebrew University in Jerusalem and was admitted to the Israeli bar in 1969. In 1972 he earned a Master of Law (LL.M.) degree from the University of Virginia in the United States before being awarded a D.Jur. from Osgoode Hall Law School in Canada. Grunis served as a Justice of the Supreme Court of Israel from 2003 to January 2015.

Personal life 
Grunis is married to Rina Meshel-Grunis, a former judge of the Tel-Aviv District Court. He has three daughters and two grandsons.

References

1945 births
Living people
Judges of the Supreme Court of Israel
Hebrew University of Jerusalem Faculty of Law alumni
University of Virginia School of Law alumni
Academic staff of Tel Aviv University
Israeli people of British-Jewish descent
Israeli soldiers
Osgoode Hall Law School alumni
People from Tel Aviv
Chief justices of the Supreme Court of Israel